Juan de Vaca (also Juan de Baca) (died 1565) was a Roman Catholic prelate who served as Bishop of Panamá (1561–1565).

Biography
Juan de Vaca was born in Valladolid, Spain and ordained a priest in the Order of Saint Benedict. On January 27, 1561, Pope Pius IV, appointed him Bishop of Panamá and he was consecrated bishop on February 8, 1562. He served as Bishop of Panamá during the governorship of Luis de Guzman and successfully organized a counter-revolt against Rodrigo Méndez who seized the city during the governor's absence. He was also credited by the townsfolk with miraculously halting an expansive fire in 1563 by leading a procession with the Blessed Sacrament directly to the heart of the fire which was then shortly thereafter extinguished. He served as Bishop of Panamá until his death in 1565. He was the co-consecrator of Francisco del Toral, Bishop of Yucatán.

References

External links and additional sources
 (for Chronology of Bishops) 
 (for Chronology of Bishops) 

Year of birth unknown
1565 deaths
Bishops appointed by Pope Pius IV
16th-century Roman Catholic bishops in Panama
Benedictine bishops
People from Valladolid
Roman Catholic bishops of Panamá